Bloomington is an unincorporated community in Osborne County, Kansas, United States.  It is located about 4 miles west of Osborne.

History
Bloomington was originally called Tilden, and under the latter name was platted in 1871. The present name of Bloomington was adopted in 1873. A post office was opened in Bloomington in the 1870s, and remained in operation until it was discontinued in 1955.

Education
Bloomington grade school was closed in 1968.

References

Further reading

External links
 Osborne County maps: Current, Historic, KDOT

Unincorporated communities in Osborne County, Kansas
Unincorporated communities in Kansas